Find Out What Happens When People Start Being Polite for a Fucking Change is an EP by Shit and Shine, released in October 2013 by Gangsigns. The cover art made number thirty out of thirty on Fact magazine's "The 30 Best Album Covers of 2013" list.

Track listing

Personnel
Adapted from the Find Out What Happens When People Start Being Polite for a Fucking Change liner notes.
Shit and Shine
 Craig Clouse – vocals, instruments

Release history

References 

2013 EPs
Shit and Shine albums